The ShopBack Group is Asia-Pacific’s leading shopping, rewards, and payments platform, serving over 38 million shoppers across ten markets. ShopBack offers a suite of products to their users - from Cashback through purchases both Online and In-Store, Vouchers and deals, as well as payment options.

ShopBack was founded in Singapore in 2014, to make shopping more rewarding, delightful, and accessible.  It offers smart shopping experiences to users across the Asia-Pacific, while helping brands and retailers in the region increase outreach and engage shoppers.

The Group powers over US$3.7 billion in annual sales for over 15,000 online and in-store partners.  In 2022, ShopBack launched ShopBack Pay and PayLater, extending the platform's offerings into financial services, providing shoppers responsible and convenient payment options at checkout. 

It is partnered with firms such as Amazon, Booking.com, eBay, ASOS, Zalora, Woolworths Online, Lazada, Uber, Grab, Shopee, Tokopedia, GoWabi, Blibli, Alibaba, and eBay.

ShopBack is available in 10 countries including Australia, Indonesia, Malaysia, Philippines, Singapore, Hong Kong, South Korea, Taiwan, Thailand, Vietnam.

History
ShopBack’s founding team was previously from Zalora.

In April 2020, ShopBack announced the acquisition of Ebates Korea. 

On 17 September 2020, ShopBack suffered a data breach. They notified customers 8 days later on 25 September 2020.

Funding
For its first round of seed funding, ShopBack raised over US$500,000. The company has since experienced a fast growth.  In March 2015, ShopBack received further investment funding of US$600,000.

In November 2017, ShopBack revealed it had raised US$25 million, a round led by Japanese finance and credit card company Credit Saison, with participation from Blue Sky, AppWorks, Intouch Holdings, Aetius Capital, 33 Capital, SoftBank Ventures Korea, Singtel Innov8, Qualgro and East Ventures, bringing their total funding to US$40 million. Today, ShopBack averages an order every 2 seconds, with an annualised sales figure of over US$500 million and 5 million users in early 2018.

In April 2019, ShopBack announced that it has closed a US$45 million round led by new investors Rakuten Capital and EV Growth, bringing their total funding to US$85 million. The investment will see Amit Patel, who leads Rakuten-owned cashback service Ebates, and Willson Cuaca (Managing Partner of EV Growth and East Ventures), join the board.

ShopFest
ShopBack ShopFest is an annual event hosted in partnership between e-commerce brands and ShopBack. Across the APAC region, ShopFest puts together major shopping events during the year end sale season.

ShopFest starts in September (November for Australia) and lasts for 4 months till December. Regionally, ShopBack holds the 9.9 Sales, 10.10 Sales, 11.11 Sales, Black Friday Cyber Monday Sales and 12.12 Sales. Other highlights of ShopFest includes MyCyberSale in Malaysia (27 Sep - 3 Oct), the 12.12 Hari Belanja Online Nasional (Harbolnas) in Indonesia, and Click Frenzy in Australia (12 - 13 Nov)

References

Online companies of Singapore